The women's shot put event  at the 1989 European Athletics Indoor Championships was held on 19 February.

Results

References

Shot put at the European Athletics Indoor Championships
Shot
Euro